Apocera vincentia is a species of snout moth in the genus Apocera. It is found in Guatemala.

References

Moths described in 1922
Epipaschiinae
Moths of Central America